Taiye Selasi (born 2 November 1979) is a British-American writer and photographer. Of Nigerian and Ghanaian origin, she describes herself as a "local" of Accra, Berlin, New York and Rome.

Early life and education 
Taiye Selasi was born in London, England, and raised in Brookline, Massachusetts, the elder of twin daughters of Dr. Lade Wosornu, of Ghanaian descent, a surgeon in Saudi Arabia and author of numerous volumes of poetry, and Dr. Juliette Tuakli, of Nigerian heritage, a paediatrician in Ghana known for her advocacy of children's rights, including sitting on the board of United Way. Selasi's parents separated when she was an infant. She met her biological father at the age of 12.

Her given name means first twin in her mother's native Yoruba. She had changed her surname several times; she was born with her mother's surname, she then adopted her step-father's surname (Williams), at 12 she had her surname changed to her father's (Wosornu), later she decided to adopt the hyphenated surname Tuakli-Wosornu (both her parents' last names), she eventually changed her surname to Selasi, a word from the Ewe language, that she translated as "answered prayer" or "God has heard".

Selasi graduated summa cum laude and Phi Beta Kappa with a BA degree in American studies from Yale, and earned her MPhil in international relations from Nuffield College, Oxford. Her twin sister, Yetsa Kehinde Tuakli, is a physiatrist in the US. The first African member of the International Paralympic Committee, she competes in the long jump for Ghana's national team.

Career 
In 2005 The LIP Magazine published "Bye-Bye, Babar (Or: What is an Afropolitan?)", Selasi's seminal text on Afropolitans. In "Bye Bye Babar", Selasi describes a new African diaspora; a broader mix that accepts its diversity: "Perhaps what most typifies the Afropolitan consciousness is the refusal to oversimplify; the effort to understand what is ailing in Africa alongside the desire to honor what is wonderful, unique." Selasi does not seek recognition as the originator of Afropolitanism, "She makes a point not to claim to have coined it, and she downplays her own role in the whole phenomenon that followed from it." The conversation of Afropolitanism increased following the essay, and this paved the way for scholars such as Simon Gikandi and Achille Mbembe to "further develop" the term, Afropolitan, into a widely known and used ideology. The same year she wrote the essay, she penned a play that was produced at a small theatre by Avery Willis, Toni Morrison's niece.

In 2006, Morrison gave Selasi a one-year deadline; she wrote "The Sex Lives of African Girls" to meet it. The story, published by UK literary magazine Granta in 2011, appears in Best American Short Stories 2012.

In 2010, Ann Godoff at Penguin Press bought Selasi's unfinished novel. Ghana Must Go was published in 2013. It was acclaimed by Diana Evans in The Guardian, Margaret Busby in The Independent, by The Economist, and by The Wall Street Journal. Selected as one of the 10 Best Books of 2013 by The Wall Street Journal and The Economist, it has been sold in 22 countries as of 2014.

In 2013, Selasi was selected as one of Granta′s 20 Best Young British Writers and in 2014 named to the Hay Festival's Africa39 list of 39 Sub-Saharan African writers under the age of 40 "with the potential and talent to define trends in African literature."

Selasi collaborates frequently with fellow artists. In 2012 she partnered with architect David Adjaye to create the Gwangju River Reading Room, an open-air library erected in 2013 as part of the Gwangju Biennale's Folly II. With director Teddy Goitom, founder of Stocktown, Selasi is Executive Producer of Afripedia, a documentary series about urban African creatives. With producers Fernando Meirelles and Hank Levine (City of God), Selasi is developing Exodus, a feature documentary about global migration.

In 2013, Selasi was a juror in the Italian reality TV show Masterpiece on Rai 3 with Andrea De Carlo.

In 2015, Selasi appeared as a Featured Author, leading a writing seminar, at the annual Iceland Writers Retreat in Reykjavik, Iceland. She is also a contributor to the anthology New Daughters of Africa (edited by Margaret Busby, 2019).

Works

Novels
 Ghana Must Go (2013)

Short stories
 "The Sex Lives of African Girls" (2011)
 "Driver" (2013)
 "Aliens of Extraordinary Ability" (2014)
 "Brunhilda in Love" (2016)

Essay
 "African Literature Doesn't Exist" (2013)

References

External links 
 
 Taiye Selasi reads from Ghana Must Go. Video by Louisiana Channel, 2013.
 "Taiye Selasi & Colum McCann: We are all multi-local". Video by Louisiana Channel, 2013.
 Interview with Taiye Selasi. Video by Louisiana Channel, 2013.

1979 births
21st-century American women writers
21st-century American writers
21st-century British women writers
21st-century English writers
Alumni of Nuffield College, Oxford
American people of Ghanaian descent
American people of Nigerian descent
American people of Yoruba descent
British twins
British women photographers
English emigrants to the United States
English people of Ghanaian descent
English people of Nigerian descent
English people of Yoruba descent
Living people
Milton Academy alumni
Penguin Press books
Writers from Brookline, Massachusetts
Writers from London
Yale University alumni
Yoruba women writers